The Roundball Classic, originally known as The Dapper Dan Roundball Classic (also known as Magic Johnson's Roundball, Sonny Vaccaro's Roundball Classic, EA Sports Roundball Classic, Asics Roundball Classic) is well known in the sports world as the first national high school All Star basketball game.  It was sponsored by and used as a fundraising event for the Dapper Dan Charities in Pittsburgh.  The inaugural game was played at the Civic Arena in Pittsburgh, Pennsylvania on March 26, 1965.

History

Founding
The  cofounders of the game, Sonny Vaccaro and Pat DiCesare, were two boyhood friends from the small Western Pennsylvania town of Trafford.  Vaccaro was a young school teacher and sports enthusiast who in the early 1960s had organized local high school basketball tournaments throughout Pennsylvania.  His friend and college roommate Pat DiCesare (future president of DiCesare Engler Productions) had made a name for himself by promoting major concert events in Western Pennsylvania.  Vaccaro wanted to do a basketball tournament in the Pittsburgh area, and asked DiCesare if he had interest in promoting the event. DiCesare, who had just brought the Beatles to the Pittsburgh Civic Arena, wanted the event to have national appeal and take place in a large venue.  So, he encouraged his friend to recruit the best players in the country.  The two friends decided that the game would feature high school All-Star players recruited from Pennsylvania against those recruited from the rest of the United States, and it would be played at the Pittsburgh Civic Arena.

Tim Tormey, a friend and business mentor to Pat DiCesare, initiated a meeting between DiCesare and Al Abrams. Abrams was the senior sports editor for the Pittsburgh Post-Gazette and the president of the Dapper Dan Club, a charitable organization associated with the Post-Gazette. Having Abrams involved meant sponsorship for the game as well as months of sports coverage in the Post-Gazette leading up to the game.  Abrams agreed to have the Dapper Dan Club sponsor the game, but DiCesare had to guarantee Abrams that he would cover any monetary losses and that a portion of the proceeds would go the Dapper Dan Club charities. DiCesare booked a date for the first game to be played on March 26, 1965 at the Civic Arena.

The first game suffered a major recruiting loss when the premier recruit in the nation, Lew Alcindor (later known as Kareem Abdul-Jabbar) declined their offer to play in the game.  His coach would not allow him to play. Otherwise, Vaccaro had succeeded in getting big time high school talent from Pennsylvania and the rest of the United States.  The format for the first game featured the National All-Stars vs. the Pennsylvania All-Stars at 9pm with a preliminary game that featured the Western Pennsylvania All Stars vs. City Catholic All-Stars game at 7pm.   More than 10,000 fans attended the first game.

Growth
In the early years, the game quickly gained greater media coverage and a bigger fan following.  The game was important for recruiting purposes as hundreds of colleges coaches and even pro scouts attended the game. It was known to be the "premier high school basketball attraction in the entire nation".

The most popular years were in the 1970s and early 1980s with a record crowd of almost 17,000 fans in 1977. In 1985 the matchup was slated as the East US All-Stars vs. the West US All-Stars. Some believed that changing the format and eliminating the Pennsylvania All-Stars compromised the attendance of the game. The attendance declined slightly in the mid to late 1980s, but the game still received national attention. It was well represented by all of the major recruiting figures in college basketball, and well respected in the sport of basketball.  ESPN continued to broadcast the game yearly.  Ultimately, the game was hurt by the emergence of other high school All Star games that followed – most notably the McDonald's High School All-Star game (McDonald's All-American Team) that began in 1977. Also, the NCAA enacted a rule that restricted athletes to play in only two All-Star games.

Decline and end
The game suffered two major losses in the early 1990s when both Nike and the Dapper Dan Club pulled their sponsorship. With DiCesare's blessing, Sonny Vaccaro moved the game to Detroit in 1993. The 28th Annual Roundball Classic was the last to be played in Pittsburgh on April 11, 1992.

The demand for the game in Pittsburgh was great enough that the Civic Arena in cooperation with Pat DiCesare continued doing a high school All-Star basketball game with Asics as a sponsor and utilizing player recruiters from local colleges.  As expected, the Pittsburgh game could not get the talent that Vaccaro was able to get in Detroit.  The last game in Pittsburgh was played in April 1994.

Vaccaro took the game to Detroit in 1993 where it became known as Magic Johnson's Roundball Classic. The game was played there for 7 years. It was moved to Raleigh, North Carolina in 2000 until it finally was moved to Chicago in 2002 (the 2001 edition was held at the Welsh–Ryan Arena in Evanston, Illinois) where it was simply named "The  Roundball Classic". The game continued to have successful years after Pittsburgh.  Most  notably, it sold out the United Center in Chicago in 2003 when the game featured LeBron James, gathering an attendance of 19,678, the highest in Roundball Classic history, beating the previous record of 16,649 established in 1977. The last game was The 43rd Roundball Classic played in Chicago in 2007.

Game results

Wins by team

Pennsylvania vs. United States format

East vs West format

MVPs

Pennsylvania vs. United States format 

After the game two MVPs were named: one for the Pennsylvania team and one for the U.S. team. In 1979 and 1986 three U.S. selections played (East, Midwest and Southwest in 1979; East, South and North in 1986).

East vs. West format

Alumni
Notable alumni include:

Mahmoud Abdul-Rauf
Shareef Abdur-Rahim
Trevor Ariza
Maceo Baston
Thurl Bailey
Benoit Benjamin
Keith Bogans
Aaron Brooks
Kobe Bryant
Matt Carroll
Vince Carter
Wilson Chandler
Lenny Cooke
Eddy Curry
Adrian Dantley
Glen Davis
Paul Davis
Keyon Dooling
Chris Duhon
LaPhonso Ellis
Patrick Ewing
Raymond Felton
Kevin Garnett
Drew Gooden
A. C. Green
Gerald Green
Jason Hart
Dwight Howard
Juwan Howard
Mark Jackson
Joe Johnson
Rashard Lewis
Shaun Livingston
Moses Malone
Stephon Marbury
Rodney McCray
Tracy McGrady
Josh McRoberts
Sean Miller
Randolph Morris
Alonzo Mourning
Calvin Murphy
Joakim Noah
Steve Novak
Greg Oden
Lamar Odom
Shaquille O'Neal
Travis Outlaw
 Tom Payne
Kendrick Perkins
Paul Pierce
Leon Powe
Gabe Pruitt
Joel Przybilla
Jason Richardson
Byron Scott
Josh Smith
Tim Thomas
Gerald Wallace
Rasheed Wallace
Chris Webber
Dominique Wilkins
Marvin Williams
Shawne Williams

Venues 
1965–1992: Civic Arena in Pittsburgh, Pennsylvania
1993–1999: The Palace in Auburn Hills, Michigan
2000: Raleigh Entertainment & Sports Arena in Raleigh, North Carolina
2001: Welsh–Ryan Arena in Evanston, Illinois
2002–2007: United Center in Chicago, Illinois

References

1965 establishments in Pennsylvania
2007 disestablishments in Pennsylvania
All-star games
Basketball in Pennsylvania
High school basketball competitions in the United States
Recurring sporting events established in 1965
Recurring sporting events disestablished in 2007